Van Helsing is a 2004 action horror film written and directed by Stephen Sommers. It stars Hugh Jackman as Dutch monster hunter Van Helsing, and Kate Beckinsale as Anna Valerious. Van Helsing is both a homage and tribute to the Universal Horror Monster films from the 1930s and 1940s (also produced by Universal Pictures which were in turn partially based on novels by Bram Stoker and Mary Shelley), of which Sommers is a fan.

The eponymous character was inspired by the Dutch vampire hunter Abraham Van Helsing from Irish author Bram Stoker's novel Dracula. Distributed by Universal Pictures, the film includes a number of monsters such as Count Dracula (and other vampires), Frankenstein's monster, Duergar, Mr. Hyde and werewolves in a way similar to the multi-monster movies that Universal produced in the 1940s, such as Frankenstein Meets the Wolf Man, House of Frankenstein and House of Dracula. The film received mostly negative reviews but grossed $300 million worldwide against a budget of $160–170 million.

Plot
In 1887 Transylvania, Doctor Victor Frankenstein, aided by his assistant Igor and Count Dracula, creates a monster. Dracula kills Frankenstein when he refuses to go along with the vampire's designs for the creatureas as Igor, revealed to be under Dracula's pay, watches impassively. As an angry mob storms the Castle, the monster flees to a windmill with Frankenstein's body. The mob burns down the windmill, seemingly killing the monster. A year later, monster hunter Gabriel Van Helsing travels to Notre-Dame de Paris and kills Dr. Jekyll after a brawl with Mr. Hyde. Helsing pursues evil on behalf of the Holy Order, which has protected mankind "from time immemorial". Van Helsing, who remembers nothing before he was found crawling up the steps of a church nearly dead, hopes to earn pardon for his forgotten sins and regain his memory.

At the Order's Vatican City headquarters, Van Helsing is tasked with travelling to Transylvania, destroying Dracula and protecting Anna and Velkan Valerious, the last of an ancient Romanian family. Their ancestor vowed that his descendants would kill Dracula or spend eternity in Purgatory. In Transylvania, Anna and Velkan attempt to kill a werewolf controlled by Dracula, but it falls with Velkan into a deep river gorge, managing to bite him in the process.

Van Helsing and Carl, a friar and weapons inventor, arrive at a village and join Anna's fight with Dracula's brides, Verona, Marishka and Aleera, slaying Marishka in the process. That night, Velkan visits Anna to warn her of Dracula's plans but transforms into a werewolf and escapes. Van Helsing and Anna pursue Velkan to Frankenstein's castle. They stumble upon Dracula's plan to duplicate Frankenstein's experiments to give life to thousands of his undead children, using Velkan as a conduit.

During the fray, Dracula confronts Van Helsing, whom he regards as an ancient rival. Dracula's spawn come to life, before dying due to lacking Frankenstein's original formula. Van Helsing and Anna escape and stumble upon Frankenstein's monster at the windmill, who reveals that he's the key to Frankenstein's machine to give life to Dracula's brood. Eavesdropping on their discussion, Velkan escapes with this new information.

In Anna's castle, Carl discovers a hidden painting of two rival knights. It comes to life, revealing the knights as a vampire and a werewolf in battle. While attempting to bring the monster to Rome, Van Helsing and his crew are ambushed by the brides and Velkan, near Budapest. Verona and Velkan are killed, but Van Helsing is bitten. Aleera kidnaps Anna and offers to trade her for the monster at a masquerade ball. Van Helsing locks the monster in a crypt, but the undead retrieve him for Dracula. Van Helsing and Carl rescue Anna and escape from the masquerade guests, revealed to be vampires.

At Anna's castle, Carl explains that Dracula is the son of Valerious the Elder. When he was killed in 1462 by the "Left Hand of God", Dracula made a pact with the Devil and lived again. Valerious was told to kill Dracula and gain salvation for his entire family. Unable to kill his son, he imprisoned him in an icy fortress. A fragment the Cardinal gave Van Helsing opens a path to Dracula's castle.

They find the monster, who reveals that Dracula possesses a cure for lycanthropy because only a werewolf can kill him. Van Helsing, fighting the curse, sends Anna and Carl to retrieve the cure, killing Igor and Aleera in the process. Van Helsing attempts to free the monster but is struck by lightning, bringing Dracula's children to life. Dracula and Van Helsing turn into their bestial forms and battle. Whilst both briefly return to their human forms, Dracula reveals that it was Van Helsing who killed him and offers to restore his memory. Van Helsing refuses and kills Dracula after reverting back to his werewolf form, triggering his brood's deaths. Anna arrives and injects the cure into Van Helsing but is killed by him in the process.

Van Helsing and Carl burn Anna's body on a cliff overlooking the sea. Frankenstein's monster departs by raft, and Van Helsing sees Anna's spirit reuniting with her family in Heaven. Van Helsing and Carl ride off into the sunset.

Cast

Soundtrack
The film's original soundtrack was composed by Alan Silvestri.

Merchandise

Video game
Vivendi Universal Games published a Van Helsing video game for PlayStation 2, Xbox, and Game Boy Advance. The game follows a similar plot to the film, has gameplay similar to Devil May Cry and the PS2 and Xbox versions feature the voice talent of many of the actors including Hugh Jackman.

Slot games
Van Helsing also features in a slot game produced by International Game Technology. The game is available in real world casinos and online, though users in Argentina, Australia, Canada, China, France, Germany, Israel, Italy, Netherlands, Nigeria, Norway, Russia, South Africa, Thailand, Turkey, and the US are excluded from playing the online games.

Reception

Box office
The film earned $51 million at #1 during the opening weekend of May 7–9, 2004. The film eventually grossed US$300,257,475 worldwide, of which US$120,177,084 was from the US.

Critical reception
Van Helsing received mostly negative reviews from critics.  Rotten Tomatoes, a review aggregator, reports that 24% of 226 surveyed critics gave the film a positive review; the average rating is 4.28/10. The site's consensus calls the film a "hollow creature feature that suffers from CGI overload".  Metacritic rated it 35/100 based on 38 reviews. Audiences polled by CinemaScore gave the film an average grade of "B" on an A+ to F scale. James Berardinelli of ReelViews gave an extremely negative review, rating the film half a star out of four and calling it "the worst would-be summer blockbuster since Battlefield Earth". Furthermore, he wrote: "There are quite a few unintentionally funny moments, although the overall experience was too intensely painful for me to be able to advocate it as being "so bad, it's good". ... Some, however, will doubtless view it as such. More power to them, since sitting through this movie requires something more than a strong constitution and a capacity for self-torture".

Mick LaSalle of the San Francisco Chronicle greatly disliked the film: "Writer-director Stephen Sommers (...) throws together plot strains from various horror movies and stories and tries to muscle things along with flash and dazzle. But his film just lies there, weighted down by a complete lack of wit, artfulness and internal logic. ... What Sommers tries to do here is use action as the only means of involving an audience. So story is sacrificed. Character development is nonexistent, and there are no attempts to incite emotion. Instead, Sommers tries to hold an audience for two hours with nothing up his sleeve but colored ribbons, bright sparklers and a kazoo. What he proves is that this is no way to make movies". Roger Ebert of the Chicago Sun Times gave the film 3 stars out of 4 stating that "at the outset, we may fear Sommers is simply going for f/x overkill, but by the end, he has somehow succeeded in assembling all his monsters and plot threads into a high-voltage climax. Van Helsing is silly, spectacular and fun". The film has earned some warmer reevaluation due to the failure of 2017's The Mummy.

Accolades

Spin-offs
Sommers expanded the story of Van Helsing in two direct spin-offs:
 The animated prequel titled Van Helsing: The London Assignment takes place before the main events of the film, focusing on Van Helsing's mission to try to stop Dr. Jekyll and Mr. Hyde from terrorizing London.
 There is also a one-shot comic book, published by Dark Horse Comics, titled Van Helsing: From Beneath the Rue Morgue, that follows Van Helsing on a self-contained adventure that occurs during the events of the film, just after the death of Jekyll/Hyde in Paris but before Van Helsing returns to Rome. In the adventure, Van Helsing deals with Doctor Moreau and his hybrid mutants.

Reboot
In May 2012, Universal Pictures announced that they would be rebooting the film with Alex Kurtzman and Roberto Orci as a two-year deal to produce a modern reimagining and Tom Cruise to star as the title character and also produce the film. In October, Rupert Sanders entered early negotiations to direct the film. By November 2015, Jon Spaihts and Eric Heisserer signed onto the project as co-screenwriters, though Cruise left his role with the film. However, in the following year, Cruise was cast to appear in Kurtzman's The Mummy, which was released in theaters on June 9, 2017. Following the poor critical and financial reception to the film, Universal restructured their plan for rebooted adaptations of their Classic Monsters to be stand-alone in nature.

By December 2020, the reboot was back in development. Julius Avery will serve as director, in addition to doing a rewrite of an original script by Eric Pearson. James Wan will serve as producer. The project will be a joint production venture between Universal Pictures and Atomic Monster Productions.

See also
 Abraham Van Helsing
 Universal Monsters
 Vampire films
 List of vampire films
 List of films featuring Frankenstein's monster
 The League of Extraordinary Gentlemen (film)

References

External links

 
 
 
 
 
 Dark Horse Comics' Van Helsing one-shot comic book

2004 films
2004 horror films
2000s action horror films
2000s English-language films
2000s monster movies
Adventure horror films
American supernatural horror films
American action horror films
American monster movies
American crossover films
Dracula films
Dr. Jekyll and Mr. Hyde films
Films partially in color
Films set in 1887
Films set in 1888
Films set in Budapest
Films set in Paris
Films set in Slovakia
Films set in Transylvania
Films set in Rome
Films set in castles
Films shot in the Czech Republic
Films shot in Florida
Films shot in Los Angeles
Films shot in Paris
Films shot in Rome
Frankenstein films
Films about shapeshifting
Films about Romani people
Stillking Films films
American swashbuckler films
American vigilante films
American werewolf films
Universal Pictures films
Films directed by Stephen Sommers
Films produced by Bob Ducsay
Films produced by Stephen Sommers
Films scored by Alan Silvestri
Films with screenplays by Stephen Sommers
Van Helsing (Universal Pictures franchise)
2000s American films
Czech crossover films
Czech action horror films
Catholic Church in popular culture